Sandra is a lost 1924 American silent drama film directed by Arthur H. Sawyer and starring Barbara La Marr and Bert Lytell. Based on the novel by Pearl Doles Bell, it was produced by Arthur H. Sawyer and Bernard Lubin's Associated Pictures for distribution by First National Pictures.

Plot
As described in a review in a film magazine, Sandra Waring (La Marr) is a woman with two personalities. Her easy-going complacent husband David (Lytell) cannot understand her, for at times she is an affectionate home-loving wife and at other times she is exotic with a craving for adventure and romance. When David faces ruin because of the collapse of a building he has designed, Sandra saves him by making a bargain with Stephen Winslow (Gordon), a connoisseur of women and at the same time finds the opportunity to follow her exotic side. She does not remain long with Winslow but visits Europe. Although she tastes romance and adventure and is acclaimed for her beauty and cleverness she is never satisfied. An affair with a Frenchman brings disillusionment when she discovered he is a crooked gambler and uses her for bait. Finally, she believes she has found happiness and true love with a bank president until he is arrested for embezzlement and it is revealed that he also has a wife. Returning home completely disillusioned, she believes that David has found happiness with Mait Stanley (Hyams), one of her best friends, and decides to take her own life after confessing her failures to David. She leaves and wanders into a church that her husband built where David’s friend Rev. William J. Hapgood (Austin) is minister. David, after he has searched in vain for his wife and come to his friend, the minister, for consolation, finally finds her at the church and takes her in his arms.

Cast

Preservation
With no prints of Sandra located in any film archives, it is a lost film. A trailer exists in the Library of Congress collection.

References

External links

Stills at silenthollywood.com

1924 films
American silent feature films
Lost American films
Films with screenplays by Barbara La Marr
Films based on American novels
First National Pictures films
American black-and-white films
Silent American drama films
1924 drama films
1924 lost films
Lost drama films
1920s American films